Tsamassi is a musical style of the Bamileke of Cameroon. It was popularised by André-Marie Tala.

Notes

References
 DeLancey, Mark W., and Mark Dike DeLancey (2000): Historical Dictionary of the Republic of Cameroon (3rd ed.). Lanham, Maryland: The Scarecrow Press.

Cameroonian styles of music